FC Polonia Berlin is a Polish association football club based in the locality of Reinickendorf in the borough of the Reinickendorf in Berlin, Germany.

History 

The club refers to the heritage of the Polski Klub Sportowy Berlin (pl) (PKS Berlin or PKS Zryw Berlin). PKS Berlin was founded in 1911. The club was  merged with BSG Handelsorganisation Berlin (BSG HO Berlin) in 1951. BSG HO Berlin was incorpororated into sports association SV Empor in 1954 and renamed BSG Empor Nord Berlin. The club was known as BSG Empor HO Berlin from 1974. The club reached the third tier of the East German football league system. BSG Empor HO Berlin was renamed SV Empor Berlin in 1990.

FC Polonia Berlin was founded in 2012 by Poles living in Berlin and Germans of Polish descent.

FC Polonia Berlin plays in the ninth tier Kreisliga A. The name Polonia is used by other Polish-centred clubs in Germany (for example Polonia Hamburg).

Seasons

References

External links 
 

Football clubs in Germany
Football clubs in Berlin
Association football clubs established in 2012
2012 establishments in Germany
Polish association football clubs outside Poland
Migrant workers football clubs in Germany